Fairport Convention is Fairport Convention's debut album. The band formed in 1967, with the original line-up consisting of Richard Thompson (guitar); Simon Nicol (guitar); Ashley “Tyger” Hutchings (bass); and Shaun Frater (drums), who was replaced after their first gig by Martin Lamble. They were joined by Judy Dyble (vocals), and Ian MacDonald (later known as Iain Matthews) after they made their major London stage debut in one of Brian Epstein’s Sunday concerts at the Saville Theatre.

With an approach strongly influenced by Jefferson Airplane's first two albums, as opposed to the electric traditional folk for which the group later became famous, the debut album features songs by Emitt Rhodes, Joni Mitchell and Jim & Jean, adaptations of poems by George Painter and Bob Dylan, and some original material.

This is the only Fairport Convention studio album on which Judy Dyble sings. She left in 1968 and was replaced by Sandy Denny but during her short time with the band she made an impression. A later article commented on her on-stage habit of knitting dishcloths and scarves when not actually singing.

The album should not be confused with the A&M Records' Fairport Convention, the USA release/re-titling of their second UK album, What We Did on Our Holidays.  The first album, listed as a product of Polydor-England, was finally released in the U.S. on Cotillion Records in 1970.

Track listing

Personnel

Fairport Convention
 Judy Dyble – lead vocals, electric and acoustic autoharps, recorder, piano
 Ian MacDonald (Iain Matthews) – lead vocals, Jew's harp
 Richard Thompson – vocals, lead electric and acoustic guitars, mandolin
 Simon Nicol – vocals, electric 12- and 6-string and acoustic guitars
 Ashley Hutchings – bass guitar, jug, double bass
 Martin Lamble – percussion, violin

Additional personnel
Claire Lowther – cello

References

External links

1968 debut albums
Fairport Convention albums
Albums produced by Joe Boyd
Polydor Records albums
Cotillion Records albums